Philadelphia and Reading Railroad Bridge may refer to one of four bridges crossing the Schulykill River in Pennsylvania:

 Philadelphia & Reading Railroad Bridge (Harrisburg, Pennsylvania), between Harrisburg and Cumberland County
 Philadelphia & Reading Railroad Bridge at West Falls, in Philadelphia
 Philadelphia & Reading Railroad Mule Bridge, in Philadelphia
 Philadelphia & Reading Railroad, Schuylkill River Viaduct in Fairmount Park, Philadelphia